The following are the winners of the 14th annual (1987) Origins Award, presented at Origins 1988:

External links
 1987 Origins Awards Winners

1987 awards
1987 awards in the United States
Origins Award winners